The 2015 São Paulo Women's Sevens was the second tournament of the 2014–15 World Rugby Women's Sevens Series. It was held over the weekend of 7–8 February 2015 at Arena Barueri in São Paulo metropolitan area, and was the second edition of the Women's São Paulo Sevens as part of the World Rugby Women's Sevens Series.

Format
The teams are drawn into three pools of four teams each. Each team plays every other team in their pool once. The top two teams from each pool advance to the Cup/Plate brackets while the top 2 third place teams also compete in the Cup/Plate. The other teams from each group play-off for the Bowl.

Teams
The participating teams and schedule were announced on 15 October 2014.

Pool Stage

Pool A

Pool B

Pool C

Knockout stage

Bowl

Plate

Cup

References

External links
 HSBC Women's Sevens Website

2014–15 World Rugby Women's Sevens Series
São Paulo Sevens
2015 in women's rugby union
2015 rugby sevens competitions
2015 in Brazilian sport